Alex Rif (born 1986) is an Israeli poet, cultural-social entrepreneur and community organizer whose works are published in the Hebrew language. 

Rif is the founder CEO of The Cultural Brigade, a social activist movement which rebranded Russian-Israeli culture and made the Russian-speaking immigrants feel at home. The Cultural Brigade is a subgroup of a larger Russian-Israeli social activist group, Generation 1.5.

Rif's book of poetry, Silly Girl of the Regime, earned numerous awards, including the Matanel award for Promising Young Jewish Poet and the Bourgeoning Poets Award from the Ministry of Culture.

Life 

Rif was born in Ukraine in 1986. Later she and her family immigrated to Israel in 1991. She grew up in Netanya, a town in west-central Israel. Her mother worked as a house keeper and her father was an electrician. She studied in Tchernichovsky high school, volunteered for the student council and MDA, did a year of community service in the Bronfman Fellowship community and served as an IDF officer in the Intelligence Corp. She graduated from the Hebrew University in Jerusalem, where she obtained a B.A. in business and political science, as well as an M.A. in public policy. Worked in the Ministry of Economy as Senior Advisor to the Employment Commissioner in the field of unique population employment.

During her childhood and youth, Rif did everything she could to assimilate into the Israeli "Sabra" culture, being ashamed of the language and culture of her parents and friends. Only at the age of 25 she became interested in her family's history and heritage.

Rif graduated from the Mandel Leadership Program in Jewish Culture, Program 120 - a multicultural political reserve for a social partnership of the Shaharit Institute, and Helicon's poetry track. She's an avid speaker and lecturer on Russian culture related issues. In 2018, the Lady Globes newspaper picked Rif as one of the 20 most influential activists in Israel.

Projects

Generation 1.5 
Rif wanted to "tell her story" and therefore began studying screenwriting at Sam Spigel Film and Television school in Jerusalem. As part of her cinematic work, she realized that this is not just the story of her family, but the story of every generation of young people from the Soviet Union who immigrated to Israel at a young age and that she is part of the 1.5 generation. In 2015, she joined the "Generation 1.5" group, active from the social protest days in Israel 2011 and raises social issues related to the Russian-speaking public.

This organization is composed of Russian-speaking men and women, most are former Soviet immigrants who have immigrated to Israel during the 1990s. The primary goal of the institution is to spread Russian culture along with stories of Russian immigrants to the general public in Israel for the purpose of reshaping the perception of Russian-speakers in Israel. The organization often convenes Russian-themed cultural events for Hebrew speakers. The organization also frequently interacts with Israeli politicians in order to inform them on issues many Russian-Israelis face.

The Cultural Brigade 
Rif is the CEO and founder of The Cultural Brigade. The Cultural Brigade is a grassroots social activist Generation 1.5 movement, working since 2015 to make immigrants from the former USSR feel accepted in Israel for their story and culture, through projects aimed to rebrand various cultural aspects, targeting critical cultural stakeholders and opinion shapers in the Israeli public.

Among the movement activities:

"Israeli Novy God" a project focused on explaining the purpose of the Russian celebration of New Year's to Hebrew speakers. The project turned the holiday into an Israeli festival, breaking stereotypes about its connection to the Christian “Silvester” and encouraging Russian-speakers to host their Israeli born friends.

"Operation Veteran" a project which sought public recognition of WW2 stories of Russian Jewish veterans through public campaign and meetings with veterans. The project led to the acknowledgment of May 9 as an official national day of commemoration by the Israeli Parliament in 2017.

"Immigration Poetry" and "Tusovka" which allow poets and artists from the former Soviet Union to share their experiences of immigration and express their Russian-Israeli identity through the art.

“Soviet City Themed Festivals”, Israeli artwork inspired by Jewish-Soviet history from Odessa and Saint-Petersburg inside of Israeli large museums and cultural institutions such as: Eretz Israel Museum Tel-Aviv, Beit Hatfutsot and more.

“Circumcision Stories” a project in which Israeli men revealing their stories of going through circumcision as adults.

“Evidence Season” a project which gives a voice to the injustice of 350K Russian-speakers who cannot get married in Israel for religious reasons.

One Million Lobby 
One Million Lobby is the first Israeli public lobby to advocate for a better social, economic, and cultural reality for the 1.2 million RSI. A non-partisan, non-profit NGO based on individual donations and public participation. Rif is the CEO.

Works 
In 2018, Pardes publishing (edited by Yael Globerman) published a book of Rif's first poems, Silly Girl of the Regime, which summarizes in fifty poems the immigration experiences of Russian immigrants in Israel. Rif's poetry emphasizes storytelling as a literary technique and tool to bring the experiences of Russian speakers in Israel to Hebrew-speaking Israelis.

For example, the poem "Evgeny" describes the bullying of Russian speakers that starts as early as the kindergarten. the poem "Recurring Dream" inscribes the experiences of Russian-speaking women who are reduced to sex work in order to make ends meet in Israel. Another poem, "Milah" revisits another painful memory in the immigration experience of Russian men - the adult circumcision.

References

1986 births
Living people
Israeli poets
Israeli activists